Visakha Wijeyeratne (Sinhala: විශාකා විජයරත්න, née Bulankulame) (17 March 1935 – 13 April 1999)  was a Sri Lankan artist, painter, sculptor, writer and social worker. Her husband, Tissa Wijeyeratne, was a politician, diplomat, barrister and businessman.

Early days
Visakha Wijeyeratne was born at Sirimedura, Horton Place Colombo 7 to Dr Edmund Ashoka Bulankulame and Ivy Dunuwille Senenayake. Her father was one of the first Ceylonese medical doctors to pass out from the prestigious University of Edinburgh in Scotland. The Bulankulame family were custodians of the Atamasthana and Dr Bulankulame held the high post of Atamasthana Nilame (chief lay custodian of Atamasthana) for a short term on behalf of his brother. Her mother, Ivy Dunuwille Senanayake, was the eldest daughter of D S Senanayake’s older brother, D C (Don Charles) Senanayake. She was the fourth in a family of seven and spent her childhood in Anuradhapura.

Education
She schooled at Holy Family Convent, Bambalapitiya and Newstead Girls College, Negombo  during the time when her father was in General Practice. Her post-secondary education was in Agriculture, Farming, Art History, Art and Foreign Languages. She followed these areas of study and practice over a period of seven years at the Farm School for girls in Kundasale, the Heywood Institute of Art under David Paynter, at the Alliance Francaise, Goethe Institute and at the Russian Cultural Centre.

Artistic career

Visakha Wijeyeratne was an ardent artist. Her style was a post-impressionistic style in oil on canvas - using primarily a yellow ochre base colour and building up layers until she finished her product.

In 1967 she moved to St. Gallen, a city on the German side of Switzerland. Working and living alone, she trained in hand embroidery, and later headed the department at Schleifer’s, an acclaimed embroidery establishment founded in 1865. When she returned to Sri Lanka, she started a cottage industry to revive ancient Sinhala embroidery techniques, with Ananda Coomaraswamy’s “Medieval Sinhalese Art” as her primary source of inspiration. Her repertoire was in portraits and paintings of infants. In 1974, she discovered that the Sri Lankan art market did not appreciate her painting style, using heavy brushstrokes. She was forced to convert to a more realistic style, a transition she loathed. Her later landscapes and portraits had lost the effect of the heavy brushstrokes. In later years she developed a skill in water colour paintings of scenery and orchid flowers.

Her skills lay in painting, sculpture, ceramic art, embroidery, writing, poetry and limerick composition. She taught hand embroidery to students and held language lessons in German, French, Russian and Sinhala.

Visakha Wijeyerate was famous for one of the finest reproductions of the 1815 portrait of Rangamma, main consort of Kandy’s last king, Sri Wickreme Rajasinghe. Her other notable reproductions were of Fragonard’s “Inspiration”; Carlo Dolci’s “St. Cecilia”and Da Vinci’s “Mona Lisa". In 1981, at her peak, she was commissioned to do the portrait of President J.R Jayawardene. Her most notable international exposure was in 1987 when she exhibited, along with 56 Commonwealth artists, at The Bhownagree Gallery of the Commonwealth Institute in Kensington, London.

As diplomat’s wife
As an artist, her impressionistic style was greatly appreciated in Paris, where she exhibited on three occasions during her four years as the Sri Lankan ambassador’s wife. Her paintings were bought by dignitaries in Paris and the diplomatic circle of the early 1970s. Buyers included US Under-Secretary of State, John N. Irwin II, German Chancellor Helmut Schmidt, Chilean Nobel laureate Pablo Neruda, Indonesia First Lady, Devi Sukarno, and British Liberal party leader, Jeremy Thorpe, to name a few.

Family
Tissa and Visakha Wijeyeratne had one daughter, Kalpana and a son, Ravana, who is the current Managing Director of Sinhaputra Finance  PLC, Kandy and the current Honorary Consul for France in Kandy. Visakha was the daughter of Dr Edmond Asoka Bulankulame and Ivy Senanayake Bulankulame of Nuwarawewa Walauwa, Anuradhapura.

References

External links
 The Senanayake Ancestry
The Wijeyeratne Ancestry

1935 births
1999 deaths
20th-century sculptors
Alumni of Holy Family Convent, Bambalapitiya
Modern painters
Modern sculptors
Sinhalese artists
Sri Lankan Buddhists
Sri Lankan painters
Sri Lankan sculptors
Visakha
Sri Lankan women artists
Embroiderers